Calopăr is a commune in Dolj County, Oltenia, Romania with a population of 3,723 people. It is composed of five villages: Belcinu, Bâzdâna, Calopăr, Panaghia, and Sălcuța.

The commune is located in the east-central part of the county and belongs to the Craiova metropolitan area.

The remnants of a Dacian fortress have been discovered in Bâzdâna.

References

Communes in Dolj County
Localities in Oltenia